Pram is a municipality in the district of Grieskirchen in the Austrian state of Upper Austria.

Geography
Pram lies in the Hausruckviertel. About 9 percent of the municipality is forest, and 82 percent is farmland.

References

Cities and towns in Grieskirchen District